House Mountain may refer to:

 House Mountain (Arizona)
 House Mountain (Knox County, Tennessee)
 House Mountain (Rockbridge County, Virginia)

See also
 Mountain House (disambiguation)